Ernő Foerk (3 February 1868, Temesvár – 26 January 1934, Budapest) was a Hungarian architect.

Life
Foerk originally began as a sculptor, but subsequently finished as a master builder. He studied at the Vienna Academy of Fine Arts, where he familiarised himself with the North Italian style, and this was the origin of his interest in Lombardian brick architecture. From 1891, he was assistant to Imre Steindl at the Technical University. He taught at the Hungarian School of Applied Arts from 1898 and became its director in 1920. He retired in 1929.

References 

 Sz. Gy.: In memoriam Foerk Ernő - Magyar Művészet, X. évfolyam, 1934. 2. szám, 55 oldal.
 Hadik András – Pusztai László: Foerk Ernő (1868-1934) építész emlékkiállítása. Az O.M.F. Magyar Építészeti Múzeumának katalógusa. Budapest, O.M.F., 1984. 55 o. ill. 
 Új magyar életrajzi lexikon II. (D–Gy). Főszerk. Markó László. Budapest: Magyar Könyvklub. 2001. 725. o. 

1868 births
1934 deaths
Architects from Timișoara
Academy of Fine Arts Vienna alumni
Hungarian architects